Alexander "Alick" Morvaren Maclean (20 July 1872 – 18 May 1936) was an English composer and conductor.

Maclean's father Charles Maclean was Director of Music at Eton College. The younger Maclean was born there and later went to the school. He became interested in opera and wrote an 'English' verismo work called Petruccio. This was presented in a double-bill with Cavalleria rusticana at the Royal Opera in London, on 29 June 1895. As an opera composer he enjoyed more success in Germany than in England, and two of his later works were staged in Mainz. The librettist for all his works was Sheridan Ross.

From 1912 to 1935 he conducted the Spa Orchestra at Scarborough. He died in London in 1936.

Stage works
 Crichton (unperformed, c. 1892)
 Quentin Durward (London, 1894)
 Petruccio (London, 1895)
 Die Liebegeige (Mainz, 1906)
 Maître Seiler (London, 1909)
 Die Waldidylle (Mainz, 1913)

Recordings
Maclean recorded for HMV and Columbia, especially with the New Queen’s Hall Light Orchestra.

References
Banfield, Stephen (1992), 'Maclean, Alick' in The New Grove Dictionary of Opera, ed. Stanley Sadie (London)

External links
British Pathé newsreel of Maclean at Scarborough in 1932, accessed 29 October 2019
Damian's 78s review of Maclean's 1923 recording of the Peer Gynt Suite accessed 26 October 2009

English opera composers
Male opera composers
English classical composers
1872 births
1936 deaths
English male classical composers